Daryl Lynn Coley (October 30, 1955 – March 15, 2016) was an American Christian singer. At 14, Coley was a member of the ensemble "Helen Stephens and the Voices of Christ". He began performing with Edwin Hawkins in the Edwin Hawkins Singers and then worked with James Cleveland, Tramaine Hawkins, Sylvester, Pete Escovedo and others. Albums of his include Just Daryl, He's Right On Time: Live From Los Angeles, When The Music Stops and others.

Early life
Coley was born in Berkeley, California on October 30, 1955. In his childhood, he sang in the Oakland Children's Chorus, in Oakland, California. His parents separated when he was five years old, with he and his two siblings being raised by his mother in a solid Christian home. Musically, Coley was first influenced by his mother. Daryl stated, "In my house there was gospel, classical and jazz. I had that kind of musical influence." During his childhood, he learned to play clarinet and piano.

In 1968, when Edwin Hawkins released "Oh Happy Day", the contemporary arrangement caught Coley's ear. In December 1969, at the age of 13, Coley first heard Helen Stephens And The Voices Of Christ, and by February of the next year had become a member of the nationally acclaimed ensemble. During his high school years, Coley was a student of Phillip Reeder, Castleers choir director at Castlemont High School. Coley's musical horizons were widened by Reeder, who also encouraged him to enroll in college. As he continued his education in college, Coley's career developed further. He was a top student, was pursuing a business degree, and even helped out with the teaching of college courses.

Career
Coley eventually began performing with Edwin Hawkins in the Edwin Hawkins Singers.  He played keyboards for The Hawkins Family from 1977 until he left to collaborate with James Cleveland in 1983. Later, he served as musical director for Tramaine Hawkins when she launched her solo career. Concurrently, Coley branched out in secular circles, singing in jazz clubs, working with artists like Sylvester, Pete Escovedo, and others. He would later collaborate with jazz artists such as Nancy Wilson and Rodney Franklin, and pop artists such as Philip Bailey of Earth, Wind & Fire fame. Coley provided the singing voice of Bleeding Gums Murphy in The Simpsons episode "Dancin' Homer", wherein he performs a comedically over-long version of  "The Star-Spangled Banner".

In 1986, Coley released his solo debut album Just Daryl, originally released in 1986 on First Epistle/Plumline Records. The album was nominated for a Grammy award, and was later re-released in 2006. After the success of Just Daryl, he moved to gospel stardom, releasing critically acclaimed albums highlighting his jazz-infused vocal stylings. In 1990, Coley released He's Right On Time: Live From Los Angeles with Sparrow Records, climbing to the #3 spot on the gospel charts. His following album When The Music Stops, released in 1992, reached #1 on the gospel charts.

In 1991, when his albums released under Sparrow Records were achieving national success, Coley fell sick, experiencing flu-like symptoms. When he visited his doctor (more than two weeks later), he was diagnosed with juvenile diabetes, which caused him temporary blindness. He continued to struggle with diabetes.

Death
On March 15, 2016, Daryl Coley succumbed to diabetes and died in hospice care from renal failure. He was 60.

Discography

Just Daryl (1986)
Unless otherwise indicated, Information is taken from Allmusic.com
Released in 1986 under the Alliant label, Just Daryl is Coley's debut solo album. It contains Coley's celebrated cover of J.C. White's "II Chronicles," also called This Is the Answer.

"Closer" (Jonathan DuBose Jr., Daryl Coley)
"II Chronicles" (JC White)
"Hang On In There" (Daryl Coley)
"Caught Up" (Rickey Grundy)
"I've Been Born Again" (Daryl Coley)
"Nobody Like the Lord" (Daryl Coley)
"Deliverer" (Rev. Quincy Fielding Jr.)
"Stand Still and Know" (Walter Hawkins)
"Spirit of the Lord (Intro)"
"Spirit of the Lord"
"Great is Thy Faithfulness"
"Hallelujah You're Worthy" (Gary Oliver)

Personnel 
Daryl Coley- Arranger, Lead Vocals, Background Vocals, Grand Piano, Roland Juno 6 Synthesizer 
Gerald Albright- Saxophone Soloist
Dale Alexander- Background Vocals
LaShawn N. Baker- Alto Vocals
Barbara Barrett- Soprano Vocals
Alisha M. Bass- Soprano Vocals
Timothy A. Beasley- Choir Director
D'Wan Bell- Group Member, Tenor Sax
Beverly Benedict- Tenor Sax
Shandra Bennett- Soprano Vocals
Cassandra T. Biles- Soprano Vocals
Shawana Brown- Alto Vocals
Dwayne Bryant- Tenor Sax
Evelyn D. Campbell- Soprano Vocals
Yvonne Cartwright- Alto Vocals
Deborah M. Chisom- Alto Vocals
Erica Chisom- Group Member, Alto Vocals, Tenor Sax
Shaniqua Chisom- Soprano Vocals
Paula R. Collick- Alto Vocals
Deavon Collins- Soprano Vocals
Renee Craig- Alto Vocals
Traci M. Craig- Alto Vocals
Val Craig- Soprano Vocals
Pamela Crutcher- Alto Vocals
Leroy Cunningham- Alto Vocals
Rose Daugherty- Soprano Vocals
Shawn T. Davis- Tenor Sax
Wendy Davis- Soprano Vocals
Donald Dixon- Tenor Sax
Andy Evans- Tenor Sax
Rev. Quincy Fielding Jr.- Grand Piano, Hammond Organ
Typharee Fitzgerald- Alto Vocals
Rev. Yvette Flunder- Background Vocals
Kenny Ford- Synthesizer Programming
Thelma E. Gaskins- Tenor Sax
Randy D. Gates- Tenor Sax
Feloy Gibbs- Tenor Sax
Sheila Gillespie- Alto Vocals
Carlton Glenn- Tenor Sax
Andrew Gouche- Bass played by
Jackie Gouche- Background Vocals
Felicia Gray- Alto Vocals
Stephanie A. Green- Alto Vocals
Rickey Grundy- Grand Piano, Hammond Organ
James W. Hampton Jr.- Tenor Sax
Janaar Harbour- Guitar
Japho Hardin- Tenor Sax
Henrietta D. Hardin- Soprano Vocals
Faye Lewis Harper- Soprano Vocals
Gregory Harris- Tenor Sax
Walter Hawkins- Background Vocals, Grand Piano, Roland Juno 6 Synthesizer 
Harriet M. Hickson- Tenor Sax
J. J. Hodges- Drums
James Hodges- Bass played by
Monica Hollman- Alto Vocals
Starling Hooks Jr.- Tenor Sax
Cleshette Hudson- Alto Vocals
Alma Jackson- Alto Vocals
Sherrie Kibble- Group Member, Soprano Vocals
Valencia Knight- Soprano Vocals
Coreatha Knox- Soprano Vocals
Priscilla Lewis- Alto Vocals
Mary Louise L. Lowe- Alto Vocals
LaVance Madden Jr.- Tenor Sax
Shawn McClain- Soprano Vocals
Dietrick McCoy- Tenor Sax
Erica Miller- Alto Vocals
Darlena Minor- Alto Vocals
Kimberly Mont- Alto Vocals
Samia R. Mosley- Soprano Vocals
Tiara Murray- Alto Vocals
Veronica Oatis- Tenor Sax
Kenny Parker- Background Vocals
Fran Patterson- Soprano Vocals
Cheri M. Patton- Soprano Vocals
Shandra Penix- Group Member, Soprano Vocals 
Rhonda V. Petty- Alto Vocals
Dawn Pewitt- Alto Vocals
Wanda Phillips- Tenor Sax
Celena Pitts- Soprano Vocals
DeConsalan Polk- Tenor Sax
Delano Porchia- Tenor Sax
Grace M. Sawyers- Soprano Vocals
Lolita Sawyers- Tenor Sax
Derrick Schoefield- Drums
Patricia Scott- Soprano Vocals
Deborah Scruggs- Soprano Vocals
Ranetta R. Smith- Alto Vocals
Margaret Steele- Soprano Vocals
Virgil Straford- Record Producer, Music Director, Piano, Organ played by, Strings
Torria Swanson- Alto Vocals
Tara Sweat- Alto Vocals
DeLoris A. Taylor- Soprano Vocals
Billy Walker Jr.- Tenor Sax
Nadine D. Walker- Tenor Sax
Benita Washington- Group Member, Tenor Sax
Kim Washington- Alto Vocals
Myron Watkins- Keyboards
Jomyra Weaver- Tenor Sax
Antoine Weir- Tenor Sax
Charles L. Weir- Tenor Sax
Veronica Whitaker- Alto Vocals
DeeAnne E. Williams- Alto Vocals
J. Allen Williams Jr.- Arranger
Sabrina S. Williams- Soprano Vocals
Tracy Williams- Alto Vocals
Latresa Witherspoon- Alto Vocals
Paul Wright III- Record Producer

I'll Be With You (1988)
Information taken from Allmusic.com
Coley's second studio album, I'll Be With You, was released in 1988, originally under the Light Records label and later issued under the CGI label.
"The Lord's Name Is To Be Praised" (Daryl Coley)
"Worthy Is The Lamb" (Rodney Friend)
"That's What You've Done For Me" (Daryl Coley)
"Romans 10" (John P. Kee, Daryl Coley)
"More Like Jesus" (Daryl Coley)
"Jesus Is The Real Thing" (Daryl Coley)
"What Moved Him" (Oliver W. Wells)
"Hold On Until You Bless Me" (Scott V. Smith, Daryl Coley)
"I'll Be With You" (Eric Alphonson, Daryl Coley)

Personnel
Daryl Coley- Record Producer, Keyboards, Vocal Arrangement, Lead Vocals, Background Vocals
Alex Acuña- Percussion
Gigi Bailey- Soprano Vocals
Monica Barker- Production Coordinator
Darrell Brown- Tenor Vocals
Meredith Burton-Jeter- Background Vocals
Roy M. Crayton Jr.- Keyboards
Charlie Davis- Horn Section
LaShanna Dendy- Alto Vocals
Kim Devereaux- Background Vocals
Delta Dickerson- Background Vocals
Patricia Finnie- Tenor Vocals
David Foreman- Guitar
Rodney Friend- Keyboards
Ray Fuller- Guitar
Dean Galbadores- Saxophone Soloist
Sonya Griffin- Alto Vocals
Rickey Grundy- Keyboards, Strings
Victor Harris- Tenor Vocals
Kim Hutchcroft- Horn Section
Rhett Lawerence- Synthesizer Programming
Stephanie Lewis- Alto Vocals
Debbie McClendon- Background Vocals
Michelle McNally- Alto Vocals
Stephen Moore- Tenor Vocals
Jimmy Neuble- Bass Guitar
Michael Neuble- Drums
Nicole Potts- Alto Vocals
Alfie Silas- Background Vocals
Shari Simonsen- Strings
Artis Smith- Soprano Vocals
Howard Smith- Background Vocals
Scott V. Smith- Record Producer, Horn Arrangements, String Arrangements, Keyboards
Dayna Stockard- Alto Vocals
Donald Taylor- Tenor Vocals
Dorian Taylor- Soprano Vocals
Ron Taylor- Tenor Vocals
Felicia Terry- Soprano Vocals
Lucy Walker- Alto Vocals
Fred White- Background Vocals
Roderick White- Background Vocals
Tony Wilkins- Tenor Vocals

He's Right On Time: Live from Los Angeles (1990)
Unless otherwise indicated, Information is based on the Allmusic.com page for this album
Coley's third album, He's Right On Time: Live from Los Angeles, was released under the Sparrow Records label. Notable songs include "I Can't Tell It All," "He's Right On Time" and "I Need Your Spirit".

"He Delivered Me (Reprise)" (Rev. Patrick Henderson, Daryl Coley)
"The Comforter Has Come" (Scott V. Smith)
"By Faith" (Armirris Palmore)
"Thy Will Be Done" (Daryl Coley)
"I Can't Tell It All" (Rev. Calvin Bernard Rhone)
"I Can't Tell It All (Reprise)" (Rev. Calvin Bernard Rhone)
"God and God Alone" (Phil McHugh)
"He's Right On Time" (Kenny Moore, Rev. Patrick Henderson, Daryl Coley)
"Medley: He'll Never Let You Down" (Steve Roberts, Willie Small)
"Medley: Keep Moving On/I Need Your Spirit" *"Keep Moving On" written by Daryl Coley*"I Need Your Spirit" written by Willie Small
"You Are My Everything" (Armirris Palmore)
"He Delivered Me" (Rev. Patrick Henderson, Daryl Coley)

Personnel
Daryl Coley- Record Producer, Arranger, Lead Vocals, Clarinet, Piano, Keyboards
Petra Acrond- Alto Vocals
Debbie Alexander- Alto Vocals
Clyde Allen- Baritone Vocals
Sherron Bennett- Alto Vocals
Gary Bias- Saxophone
Jo Bradford Bradley- Soprano Vocals
Beverly Brown- Soprano Vocals
Ray Brown- Trumpet
Vanessa Brown- Acoustic Percussion, Electronic Percussion
Eric Cayenne Butler- Horn Arrangements, Tenor Vocals, Background Vocals
Roosevelt Christmas III- Tenor Vocals
Troy Clark- Tenor Vocals
Larry Coley- (Acoustic) Percussion
Addie Cox- Soprano Vocals
Robert Craig- Tenor Vocals
Roy M. Crayton Jr.- Keyboards
B. J. Crosby- Additional Vocals
David Daughtry- Tenor Vocals
Mittie Dawson-Allen- Soprano Vocals
Kim Devereaux-Parchman- Alto Vocals, Background Vocals
Delta Dickerson- Soprano Vocals, Alto Vocals, Tenor Vocals, Background Vocals
Valerie Doby- Soprano Vocals, Background Vocals
Debra Edwards- Soprano Vocals
Dave Foreman- Guitar
Dave Galbadores- Saxophone
Mae Gatewood- Alto Vocals
Rickey Grundy- Synthesizer
Alexander Hamilton- Choir Director
Michelle Harris-Watkins- Soprano Vocals
Cheryl D. Henry- Alto Vocals
Portia M. Houston- Alto Vocals
Avon. Hutchinson- Soprano Vocals
Charles E. Jett II- Tenor Vocals
Marvin Johnson- Choir Coordinator
Ray Lamont Jones- Tenor Vocals
Phil Jordan- Tenor Vocals
Rickey R. Lee- Tenor Vocals
Gheri Legree- Alto Vocals
Stephanie Lewis- Alto Vocals
Lucretia Massey- Alto Vocals
Bill Maxwell- Record Producer, Audio Mixing
Deidre "De De" McRae- Tenor Vocals
Will Miller- Trumpet
Tyree Mills- Tenor Vocals
Phoebe Murray- Alto Vocals
Jimmy Neuble- Bass played by 
Michael Neuble- Drums
Jerry Peters- Music Director
Marlin D. Ricketts- Soprano Vocals
Hal Sacks- Recording Engineer
Mark K. Smiley- Tenor Vocals
Shannon Sterling- Alto Vocals
Donald W. Taylor- Tenor Vocals
Dorian Taylor- Alto Vocals
Ronald B. Taylor- Tenor Vocals
Derek Turner- Synthesizer
Le-Morrious Tyler- Choir Coordinator
Johnetta Williams-Bush- Soprano Vocals
Reggie C. Young- Trombone

When the Music Stops (1992)
Information is taken from Discogs.com
When the Music Stops is Coley's second live album and his fourth overall. Released in 1992, it is also Coley's second album under Sparrow Records:
"You Can Do All Things" (Armirris Palmore) *Vocals arranged by Armirris Palmore
"Real" (Calvin Bernard Rhone) *Flugelhorn: Gary Grant
"He'll Make A Way" (Armirris Palmore) *Vocals arranged by Armirris Palmore*Choir Vocals: Voices of Integrity*Choir Coordinator: Keith Washington*Music conducted by Alexander Hamilton
"Don't Hold Back" (Darnell Givens, Derek Turner) 
"Jesus Never Fails" (Daryl Coley) *Choir Vocals: Voices of Integrity*Choir Coordinator: Keith Washington*Music conducted by Alexander Hamilton
"In Times Like These" (Armirris Palmore) *Vocals arranged by Armirris Palmore
"When the Music Stops" (V. Michael McKay) *Music arranged by V. Michael McKay
"It Shall Be Done" (Daryl Coley) *Choir Vocals: Voices of Integrity*Choir Coordinator: Keith Washington*Music conducted by Alexander Hamilton
"Integrity" (V. Michael McKay) *Music arranged by V. Michael McKay*Strings arranged by Mark Gasbarro*Choir Vocals: Voices of Integrity*Choir Coordinator: Keith Washington*Music conducted by Alexander Hamilton

Personnel
Daryl Coley- Record Producer, Lead Vocals, Vocal arranger
Bruce Bidlack- Assistant Recording Engineer
Robert Black- Percussion
James Brown- Music Director, Keyboards 
Gene Burkert- Saxophone
Kim Devereaux-Parchman- Background Vocals
Delta Dickerson- Background Vocals
Valerie Doby- Background Vocals
Mark Eshelman- Assistant Recording Engineer
David Foreman- Guitar
Dan Fornero- Trumpet
Ray Fuller- Guitar
Mark Gasbarro- Keyboards
Tom Harvey- Assistant Recording Engineer
Harry Kim- Trumpet
Jimmy Neuble- Bass played by
Michael Neuble- Drums 
Donald Patterson- Bass played by
Robert Reed- Assistant Recording Engineer
Logan Reynolds- Keyboards
Hal Sacks- Record Producer, Recording Engineer, Audio Mixing 
Edna Tatum- Narrator
Efrain Toro- Percussion
Arturo Velasco- Trombone
Vine Street Horns- Horns performed by
Fred C. White- Background Vocals
Jason White- Keyboards
Bob Wilson- Horns arranged by

In My Dreams (1994)
Information is taken from Allmusic.com
Coley's In My Dreams is fifth studio album. Released under Sparrow Records in 1994: 
"He That Dwelleth (Psalm 91)" (Armirris Palmore)
"Try Me Once Again" (Daryl Coley)
"He's Already Forgotten" (Lowell Alexander, Tim Carpenter)
"To Live Is Christ" (Kirk Franklin)
"Blessed Assurance" (Traditional)
"Heart Of The Matter" (Oliver W. Wells, Turner Lawton)
"God Is My Strength" (Percy Bady)
"You Are The Melody" (Daryl Coley)
"You Are My God" (Victor McCoy)
"In My Dreams" (V. Michael McKay)

Personnel
Daryl Coley- Vocals, Clarinet, Piano, Keyboards
Hal Sacks- Record Producer

Beyond the Veil: Live at the Bobby Jones Gospel Explosions XIII (1996)
Information taken from Allmusic.com
Coley's sixth studio album is Beyond the Veil: Live at the Bobby Jones Gospel Explosion XIII. It is also his fourth live album. It was released in 1996 under Sparrow Records, and contains songs such as "Sweet Communion", "Lamb of God", and "Wonderful".

"Wonderful" (Daryl Coley)
"Lamb of God" (Armirris Palmore)
"Sweet Communion" (Daryl Coley)
"Standing On The Promises" (Armirris Palmore)
"Beyond the Veil" (Daryl Coley)
"Nobody Like the Lord" (Armirris Palmore)
"So Much" (Armirris Palmore)
"We Are One" (Daryl Coley)
"What's In Your Name" (V. Michael McKay)
"Beyond the Veil (Reprise)" (Daryl Coley)

Personnel 
Daryl Coley- Record Producer, Lead Vocals
Jenell Alexander- Production Coordinator
James H. Brown- Music Director, Keyboards
William Cannon- Choir Vocals
Denise Chaplin- Choir Vocals
Mia Clark- Choir Vocals
Darrell Crooks- Guitar
Eric Darken- Percussion
Anthony Davis- Choir Vocals
Alex Evans- Bass played by
Carlos Greene- Choir Vocals
Marc Harris- Organ played by, Horns, Strings
Wanda Hodge- Choir Vocals
Stephanie Johnson- Choir Vocals
Arlando Jones- Choir Vocals
Denise Jones- Choir Vocals
Leah Knox- Choir Vocals
Donald Lawrence- Record Producer
Bryan Lenox- Overdub Recording Engineer, Overdubs
Fatina Mallory- Choir Vocals
Craig Minor- Choir Vocals
James Moss- Choir Vocals
Shandra Penix- Choir Vocals
Chris Randle- Choir Vocals
Fatima Richardson- Choir Vocals
Demetria Slayden- Choir Vocals
Tracey Talley- Choir Vocals
Evelyn W. Tyler- Choir Vocals
Fred Vaughn- Keyboards
Grover Whittington- Choir Vocals
Jacqueline Whittington- Choir Vocals
Demetrius A. Williams- Choir Vocals, Valvehorn
Mark Williams- Recording Engineer, Audio Mixing

Live in Oakland-Home Again (1997)
Unless otherwise indicated, Information is taken from Allmusic.com
"I Will Bless Your Name" (Daryl Coley)
"Don't Give Up On Jesus" (Thomas Whitfield)
"Removal of the Mask" (V. Michael McKay)
"That Special Place" (Daryl Coley)
"His Love" (Russell Watson, Daryl Coley)
"Jesus Saves" (James Brown)
"I Will Song Glory" (Daryl Coley)
"Thank You Lord" (Daryl Coley)
"I Can" (Daryl Coley)
"What He's Done" (Daryl Coley)
"Jesus Loves Me" (Traditional)
"Acapella Praise" (Traditional)

Personnel 
Daryl Coley- Record Producer, Clarinet, Piano, Keyboards, Lead Vocals
Elisa Anderson- Choir Member, Soprano Vocals
Martha Armstrong- Choir Member, Tenor Vocals
Cherie Beasley- Choir Member, Tenor Vocals
Robert Black- Percussion
William Bolden- Choir Member, Tenor Vocals
Meryl Borders-Humphrey- Choir Member, Alto Vocals
Sandy Bradley- Choir Member, Soprano Vocals
Diane Breaux- Choir Member, Soprano Vocals
Jeannie Broughton- Choir Member, Soprano Vocals
James Brown- Record Producer, Keyboards
Linda Brown- Choir Member, Alto Vocals
Delores Cannon- Choir Member, Tenor Vocals
Karen Carter- Choir Member, Alto Vocals
Jeralyn Crear- Choir Member, Soprano Vocals
Robin Eldridge- Choir Member, Alto Vocals
Faye Forney- Choir Member, Soprano Vocals
Gregory D. Gaines- Choir Member, Tenor Vocals
Guy Comrad Green- Choir Member, Tenor Vocals
Derrick Hall- Organ played by
Harry Hawkins- Choir Member, Tenor Vocals
Mike Hersey- Recording Engineer
Thelma Jones- Choir Member, Alto Vocals
Donald Lawrence- Audio Mixing
Monique Leonard- Choir Member, Alto Vocals
Therese Leonard-Young- Choir Member, Soprano Vocals
Aaron Lopez- Recording Engineer
DeAnn Lott- Choir Member, Soprano Vocals
Fredrik Martinsson- Audio Mixing
Jerry Mitchell- Record Producer, Recording Engineer
New Generation Singers Reunion Choir- Choir Vocals performed by
Eunice Parks- Choir Member, Tenor Vocals
Lillian Parks- Choir Member, Soprano Vocals
Faith Phifer-Hopkins- Choir Member, Soprano Vocals
Farnsworth Curtis Reed- Choir Member, Tenor Vocals
Al Richardson- Recording Engineer
Joyce Paige Roberson- Choir Member, Soprano Vocals
Larry Roberson- Choir Member, Tenor Vocals
Nina Roberson- Choir Member, Alto Vocals
Frieda Sledge-Glover- Choir Member, Soprano Vocals
Eric Smith- Bass played by
Joel Smith- Drums
John "Jubu" Smith- Guitar
Marcellos Staples- Choir Member, Tenor Vocals
Titus Starks- Choir Member, Tenor Vocals
Donald W. Taylor- Choir Member, Tenor Vocals
Mildred Holmes Taylor- Choir Member, Soprano Vocals
Nathaniel Terry- Choir Member, Tenor Vocals
Rhonda Thompson- Choir Member, Alto Vocals
Sheila A. Walker-McMullen- Choir Member, Soprano Vocals
Juanita Waller- Choir Member, Alto Vocals
Antwon Watson- Choir Member, Soprano Vocals
O-Keema Watson- Choir Member, Tenor Vocals
Loretta Watts- Choir Member, Alto Vocals
Katrina Watts-McFarland- Choir Member, Alto Vocals
Thaddeus White- Choir Member, Tenor Vocals
Angela Winding- Choir Member, Alto Vocals
Marion Witt- Choir Member, Alto Vocals
Gregory Zeno- Choir Member, Tenor Vocals

Christmas is Here (1999)
Information is taken from Allmusic.com
"God's Only Son" (Daryl Coley)
"It Came Upon a Midnight Clear/Angels We Have Heard on High"
"Music Interlude #1" (Daryl Coley)
"Emmanuel" (Daryl Coley)
"Medley: Carol of the Bells/Silver Bells" *"Carol of the Bells" written by Peter J. Wilhousky*"Silver Bells" written by Jay Livingston & Ray Evans
"Reason for the Season" 
"Music Interlude #2"
"O Come, O Come, Emmanuel/God Rest Ye Merry, Gentlemen" (Traditional)
"Glory to God" (George Frederick Handel)
"Christmas Is Here" (Daryl Coley)
"While Shepherds Watched Their Flocks"

Personnel 
Daryl Coley- Record Producer, Lead Vocals
DeWayne Brown- Tenor Vocals
Calvin Carter- Drums
Bill DeLoach- Recording Engineer
Johnny Dillard- Bass played by
Jeff Graham- Tenor Vocals
Ricky Keller- Recording Engineer
Shelton Morgan- Recording Engineer
Eric Reed- Keyboards
Oliver Wells- Keyboards
Mark Williams- Recording Engineer
Steve Williams- Tenor Vocals

Compositions: A Decade of Song (2000)
 By Faith
 Wonderful
 The Comforter Has Come
 You Are My Everything
 When Sunday Comes
 In Times Like These
 Lamb Of God
 Standing On The Promises
 You Can Do All Things

From CD back cover

Oh, The Lamb (2001)
Information is taken from Allmusic.com
 Because He's God (James Brown)
 (Narration I)
 II Chronicles (Daryl Coley)
 He Will Make A Way
 Lean On Me (Keith Crouch)
 (Narration II)
 Exchanged (Daryl Coley)
 For The Good Of Them (Darius Brooks)
 Lift Your Name On High
 (Narration III)
 Oh, the Lamb (Daryl Coley)
 Silent Scream 
 I Need You (Daryl Coley)
 He's Worthy (James Moore, Stephen Williams)
 He Can Work It Out (Kevin Bond)
 Praise

Personnel 
Daryl Coley- Record Producer, Lead Vocals
The Beloved- Additional Music performed by
Kevin Bond- Record Producer, Music Programming, Keyboards, Background Vocals
Calvin Carter- Drums
John Croslan II- Keyboards
Jeremy Haynes- Drums
Cynthia Rogers- Background Vocals
Mark Williams- Recording Engineer

Praise & Worship (2006)

"Thank You Lord" (with New Generation Singers Reunion Choir)*Written by Daryl Coley
"Because He's God" (James "Razor" Brown)
"Nobody Like the Lord" (Daryl Coley)
"Praise" (Daryl Coley)
"Oh, The Lamb" (Daryl Coley)
"He's Worthy" (S. Williams)
"God and God Alone" (Phil McHugh)
"II Chronicles" (with The Beloved) (Daryl Coley)
"Don't Give Up on Jesus" (Thomas Whitfield)
"Jesus Saves" (with New Generation Singers Reunion Choir)*Written by James "Razor" Brown
"The Medley of Praise" *Includes "We Exalt Thee", "Welcome into This Place" & "Reign Jesus Reign"
"I Will Bless Your Name" (with New Generation Singers Reunion Choir)*Written by Daryl Coley
"The Lord's Name Is to Be Praised" (Daryl Coley)
"Worthy Is the Lamb" (Rodney Friend)

Personnel 
Daryl Coley- Record Producer, Lead Vocals
The Beloved- Additional Music performed by
James "Razor" Brown- Record Producer
Dan Cleary- Record Producer
Walter Hawkins- Record Producer
Bill Maxwell- Record Producer
Jerry Mitchell- Record Producer
Nedra Olds-Neal- Compilation Producer
New Generation Singers Reunion Choir- Background Vocals performed by
Scott V. Smith- Record Producer

References

External links
Interview with Coley about his battle with diabetes, crossrhythms.co.uk
Coley profile, yahoo.com 
Coley discography, yahoo.com 
Coley profile, gospelflava.com
 Dancin' Homer, Simpsons World
 WikiSimpsons 

1955 births
2016 deaths
American gospel singers
African-American Christians
Musicians from Oakland, California
20th-century African-American male singers
Urban contemporary gospel musicians
Deaths from diabetes
Place of death missing
Sparrow Records artists
21st-century African-American male singers